Rokkaku ("six corners" or "hexagon") can refer to several things:

 Rokkaku Chuu (市立六角中学校), a fictional school that appears on The Prince of Tennis
Rokkaku clan, a clan of samurai
 Rokkaku dako, a type of six-cornered kite
 Rokkaku-dō (temple), a temple in Kyoto
 Rokkaku-dai Hights, a level from the video game Jet Set Radio Future